Puerto Rico competed at the 1956 Summer Olympics in Melbourne, Australia. Ten competitors, all men, took part in nine events in two sports.

Athletics

Men's Pole Vault
 Rolando Cruz

Shooting

Three shooters represented Puerto Rico in 1956.

Men

References

External links
Official Olympic Reports

Nations at the 1956 Summer Olympics
1956
1956 in Puerto Rican sports